McKown Creek is a stream in the U.S. state of West Virginia.

McKown Creek was named after Isaac and Gilbert McKown, local pioneer men.

See also
List of rivers of West Virginia

References

Rivers of Roane County, West Virginia
Rivers of West Virginia